One Man Band is the second album by soul singer Ronnie Dyson on Columbia. Released in 1973, it included four tracks produced by top Philly Sound producer-arranger, Thom Bell. The rest of the album featured previously recorded tracks re-mixed by Bell's collaborator, Linda Creed, including the singer's earlier hit, When You Get Right Down To It and single release, A Wednesday In Your Garden.

Reception

Track listing

Charts

Singles

External links
 Ronnie Dyson-One Man Band at Discogs

References

1973 albums
Soul albums by American artists
Columbia Records albums
Albums produced by Thom Bell